Joseph Austin Rattigan (January 24, 1920 – May 12, 2007) served in the California State Senate for the 12th district from 1959 to 1967, as a Justice of the District Court of Appeals from 1966 to 1984, and during World War II he served in the United States Navy.

References

1920 births
2007 deaths
United States Navy personnel of World War II
20th-century American politicians
United States Navy sailors
Democratic Party California state senators